Top 100 Mexico is a record chart published weekly by AMPROFON (Asociación Mexicana de Productores de Fonogramas y Videogramas), a non-profit organization composed by Mexican and multinational record companies. This association tracks record sales (physical and digital) in Mexico.

Chart history

The follow list contain the albums released in 2005 and peaked number one in México in the same year but the peak date is unknown.

References

Number-one albums
Mexico
2005